Raid on Entebbe can refer to:

 Operation Entebbe, a military operation
 Raid on Entebbe (film), a film based on Operation Entebbe